Rundelltown Creek is a  long 2nd order tributary to Carr Run in Crawford County, Pennsylvania.

Course
Rundelltown Creek rises about 0.25 miles south of Norrisville, Pennsylvania, and then flows northeast to join Carr Run about 2 miles northeast of Rundell, Pennsylvania.

Watershed
Rundelltown Creek drains  of area, receives about 45.7 in/year of precipitation, has a wetness index of 509.52, and is about 54% forested.

See also
 List of rivers of Pennsylvania

References

Rivers of Pennsylvania
Rivers of Crawford County, Pennsylvania